American Weekend is the debut album of Waxahatchee. It was released by Don Giovanni Records in 2012.

On June 11, 2012, "Be Good" was the song of the day on National Public Radio, as well as one of the best 50 songs of 2012. American Weekend was named a top album of 2012 by the New York Times and Dusted magazine.

Singer-songwriter Emily Kinney covered "Be Good" on her 2014 Expired Love album.

Track listing
 "Catfish" – 3:59
 "Grass Stain" – 2:30
 "Rose, 1956" – 2:47
 "American Weekend" – 4:11
 "Michel" – 3:01
 "Be Good" – 2:33
 "Luminary Blake" – 2:41
 "Magic City Wholesale" – 3:01
 "Bathtub" – 3:13
 "I Think I Love You" – 3:23
 "Noccalula" – 2:42

Reception
The album was awarded four stars by Scott Kerr of AllMusic.

References

2012 albums
Don Giovanni Records albums
Waxahatchee albums